Eryngium constancei is a species of flowering plant in the family Apiaceae known by the common name Loch Lomond button celery, or Loch Lomond coyote thistle. It is endemic to California, where it is known from only three occurrences north of the San Francisco Bay Area. One of the populations is at the Loch Lomond Vernal Pool Ecological Reserve at Loch Lomond in Lake County. The plant appears mainly in vernal pools. It is endangered on the state and federal levels.

Description 
This is a hairy, somewhat fleshy, perennial herb growing branching stems to 20 or 30 centimeters in height. Dark green, narrowly spade-shaped leaves grow on long petioles and may grow erect with the stems or lie flat along the ground. They may have smooth to toothed to sharply serrated edges.

Flower heads are less than a centimeter wide with a few longer, straight, sharp bracts around the base. The tiny flowers packed into the rounded head are generally white. This plant is threatened by destruction of its fragile vernal pool habitat by a number of causes, including sediment-rich runoff into the pools from logging activity, erosion, development, and off-road vehicles.

External links
 Calflora Database: Eryngium constancei (Loch Lomond button celery,  Loch Lomond eryngo)
Jepson eFlora (TJM2) treatment of Eryngium constancei
USDA Plants Profile for Eryngium constancei (Loch Lomond eryngo)
Center for Plant Conservation.org Profile
UC CalPhotos gallery of Eryngium constancei (Loch Lomond eryngo)

constancei
Endemic flora of California
Critically endangered flora of California